Blake Robert Dunlop (born April 18, 1953) is a Canadian former National Hockey League (NHL) forward who played during the 1970s and early 1980s. Prior to turning pro, Dunlop played four seasons with the Ottawa 67's of the Ontario Hockey Association (OHA). Dunlop was drafted by the Minnesota North Stars in the second round, 18th overall, of the 1973 NHL Amateur Draft.

Playing career
For his first four professional seasons, Dunlop spent much of his time with the New Haven Nighthawks, the North Stars' affiliate in the American Hockey League (AHL). He was traded to the Philadelphia Flyers, and then to the St. Louis Blues, where he experienced his most successful years. Dunlop went on to receive the Bill Masterton Memorial Trophy in 1981 with the Blues. He retired from the NHL after spending the 1983–84 season with the Detroit Red Wings. In 550 NHL games, Dunlop totaled 130 goals and 274 assists for a total of 404 points.

Awards and achievements
1973: OHA Second All-Star Team
1978: AHL First All-Star Team
1978: Fred T. Hunt Memorial Award (Sportsmanship – AHL)
1978: Les Cunningham Award (MVP – AHL)
1981: Bill Masterton Memorial Trophy
2009: Lisgar Collegiate Institute Athletic Wall of Fame

Career statistics

References

External links
 

1953 births
Living people
Bill Masterton Memorial Trophy winners
Canadian ice hockey centres
Detroit Red Wings players
Ice hockey people from Ontario
Maine Mariners players
Minnesota North Stars draft picks
Minnesota North Stars players
New England Whalers draft picks
New Haven Nighthawks players
Ottawa 67's players
Philadelphia Flyers players
St. Louis Blues players
Sportspeople from Hamilton, Ontario
World Hockey Association first round draft picks
Lisgar Collegiate Institute alumni